The Scharfenstein (English: Sharp Stone) is a rock and about 25 metres high, situated in the Lusatian Mountains. It sits on a mountain with an elevation of 569 metres in the German southeastern state of Saxony. Due to its distinctive shape it is also called the "Upper-Lusatian Matterhorn" by the locals. The rock can be accessed via ladders and a staircase from the south and is one of the most famous look-outs in the Zittau Mountains.

View 

Mountains of Saxony
Rock formations of Saxony